Federal public benefit is a legal term of art in the United States.

References

United States federal welfare and public assistance legislation
American legal terminology